The 2006 South American Rugby Championship "B" was the seventh edition of the competition of the second level national Rugby Union teams in South America.

The tournament was played in Caracas,

Brazil won  the tournament.

Standings 

 Three point for victory, two for draw, and one for lost 
{| class="wikitable"
|-
!width=165|Team
!width=40|Played
!width=40|Won
!width=40|Drawn
!width=40|Lost
!width=40|For
!width=40|Against
!width=40|Difference
!width=40|Pts
|- bgcolor=#ccffcc align=center
|align=left| 
|4||4||0||0||193||16||+ 177||12
|- align=center
|align=left| 
|4||3||0||1||96||67||+ 29||10
|- align=center
|align=left| 
|4||2||0||2||101||53||+ 48||8
|- align=center
|align=left| 
|4||1||0||3||44||68||- 24||6
|- align=center
|align=left| 
|4||0||0||4||8||238||- 230||4
|}

Results  
 First Round

Second Round

 Third Round

 Fourth Round

 Fifth Round

References

2006
2006 rugby union tournaments for national teams
B
rugby union
rugby union
rugby union
rugby union
rugby union
International rugby union competitions hosted by Venezuela